No Strings is a British television sitcom which aired on BBC1 in one series of six episodes in 1974. Written by Carla Lane, it was spun-off from an episode of the Comedy Playhouse screened in April of the same year.

Derek (Keith Barron) advertises for a new flatmate, but does not get what he expects when the unusual Leonora (Rita Tushingham) moves in. Actors appearing in individual episodes included Felix Bowness, Brenda Cowling, Jessica Benton, Louis Mahoney, Tommy Godfrey, Alister Williamson, Norman Mitchell and April Walker.

Main Cast
 Rita Tushingham as Leonora
 Keith Barron as Derek
 Gilly McIver as Iris
 David Simeon as Bruce

References

Bibliography
 Horace Newcomb. Encyclopedia of Television. Routledge, 2014.

External links
 

1974 British television series debuts
1974 British television series endings
1970s British comedy television series
BBC television sitcoms
English-language television shows